Baal Veer was an Indian fantasy television series that premiered on 8 October 2012 on SAB TV. It starred Dev Joshi in the titular role. It was produced by Optimystix Entertainment, and its screenplay was written by Rohit Malhotra.

The show aired for 1,111 episodes and went off the air on 4 November 2016. It is the first instalment to Baalveer franchise and is followed by two sequels, Baalveer Returns and Baalveer 3.

Plot 

In the universe, there is a planet called Pari Lok (Fairy Realm), where all the good fairies reside. Each of them has a different ability and each fairy is named after her special powers. The mother and leader of the fairies are the Queen Fairy - Rani Pari, who is the head of the power of love and righteousness in the whole multiverse. Below her, is a cabinet of important fairies (Pari Sabha) who maintain various departments of Pari Lok.

On the other side, there is an evil fairy, Bhayankar Pari, and her sidekick- Tauba-Tauba. They always plot to create terror on Earth, due to which Rani Pari assigns different fairies to particular locations on Earth.

The year is 2012 AD, and two fairies visit Rani Pari and inform her about the strange behaviour of children of Earth, who seemed to have been influenced by an evil power. Rani Pari assures them that she will try to find out about this and sends them back. On the same day, in night-time, all the fairies gather at the entrance of Rani Mahal (Royal Palace) due to the scary behaviour of Earth's children. The Pari Lok is in a state of alarm due to the havoc on the Earth. Rani Pari manages to placate them, but at the same time, Bhayankar Pari enters and creates an environment of terror in Pari Lok. She challenges Rani Pari that she will surely destroy Earth and spread evil, while Rani Pari will not be able to do anything. She tells her that she is the one who has hypnotized children, due to which they are behaving strangely. She says her that she will soon find the child and challenges Ranipari to save her beloved child if she can.

Many years ago, it was the time for Maa Pari (mother of the fairies) to pass her throne to another fairy. All the fairies thought that she would choose Bhali Pari as her successor as she had saved Pari Lok from an accident. Maa Pari felt that Bhali Pari wanted to become Rani Pari, and that's why she had saved Pari Lok. She was too selfish as she only wanted to rule and not to serve. Considering this, Maa Pari declared Bahuroopi Pari (Multiform Fairy), as the Rani Pari (Queen Fairy). An infuriated Bhali Pari, burning in the fire of anger and jealousy, she destroys her existence and her spirit transforms into Bhayankar Pari, the empress of evil powers. She vows to avenge the betrayal that she had borne.

When Baalveer was born, Bhayankar Pari tries to capture the child but Rani Pari comes at the right moment and saves him. Rani Pari gets unconscious due to Bhayankar Pari's attack, but a maid in that house takes Baal Veer with him leaving Bhayankar Pari furious. A fairy takes him to Parilok, but some fairies are not satisfied with that so everyone went to Rani palace to see Rani pari. Rani pari, the Queen of Parilok, the mother of Baalveer,fairies and the residents of the Fairy realm. She is the sole decision-maker. She recognizes the child, suddenly motherly love awakens in her heart and told everyone that thereafter he will reside in Parilok. Some fairies are not satisfied with her decision but they can't disobey Rani Pari's words. She also named him "Baalveer" and from then she only takes care of him as his mother and he is the first human to have resided in the Fairy Realm. Later he was accepted by all the fairies.

Ranipari decides that Baalveer is the only one who can defeat Bhayankar Pari and make an end to her terror. Rani Pari announces that Baalveer will be awarded the power of seven fairies. Some fairies disagree with this and criticize Rani Pari's decision. But, Ranipari has full faith on her son Baalveer. So nobody can't disobey Ranipari's words. In a prestigious ceremony, Baalveer is blessed with the power of Saptapari (Cabinet of Seven prominent fairies of Pari Lok) which consists of:

 Natkhat Pari (Mischievous Fairy)
 Bhatkaati Pari (Diverting Fairy)
 Atkaati Pari (Obstacle Fairy)
 Baal Pari (Tress Fairy)
 Vijhdar Pari (Electric Fairy)
 Aar-Paar Pari (Across Fairy)
 Gaal Pari (Cheek Fairy) and

Ball Veer is also blessed with the powers of Ranipari.

Rani Pari sends Baalveer to Earth. She guides him to a cottage-tea-shop owner who employs him. Later when Baalveer, as a waiter, meets Mahesh Dagli, the sole earner from Dagli household in Mumbai, India; he adopts Baalveer as his own child seeing his pitiful condition (unaware of his true identity). Baalveer introduces himself as Ballu. The Dagli family is known as Saat Sachhon ka Parivar (The Family of Seven who never lie). It consists of Mahesh,  Mahesh's father (Amit), his mother (Kasturi), his wife (Smita), his children Manav and Meher, and his younger brother (Rocky).

Bhayankar Pari plots various times in order to kill Baalveer and fairies, but fails in each attempt. In her attempts to destroy Pari Lok, she also summoned Tabahi-Pari, but failed. Later, she turned Rani Pari into stone and attained the kingdom of Pari Lok by deceiving Baalveer. However, the fairies under the guidance of Baalveer, get Pari Tara and Raj-Dand (Supreme powers of Pari Lok) back from Bhayankar and capture her in prison. While, capturing her, they accidentally release Bhawandar Pari (Tycoon Fairy). She secretly prevents them from curing Rani Pari. Finally, when the fairies cure Rani Pari and she turns to her original form,everyone was so happy to see their mother back.  Bhawandar manages to free Bhayankar Pari from the prison. Rani Pari attacks Bhayankar Pari with no delay, but Bhayankar tricks Bhawandar Pari and the weapon used by Rani Pari makes an end to Bhawandar Pari.

Again Bhayankar Pari uses various methods to spread evil but fails. She also summons Nukeeli and Kateeli Pari, but even that doesn't work. Then finally, she resurrects her best friend- Chall Pari for her mission. The fairies organise a Satkar Samaroh (Honouring Ceremony) for Baalveer to appreciate his achievements. During the dance session, when there was noise all around, Chall Pari shoots an arrow at Baalveer and herself sticks to Rani Pari's wand which disables it. Rani Pari sees the arrow moving towards Baalveer, but unable to use her wand, she moves in front of Baalveer and the arrow strikes her. She sacrifices herself to save her beloved son Baalveer. After somedays Ranipari came in front of Baalveer and says that she loves him very much and always be there with him forever.

The fairies and Baalveer make an end to Chall Pari, but Bhayankar manages to survive. Soon, Naaraz-Taaraz Pari realise their mistakes and admit their true identity in front of Baal Pari and other fairies. They forgive them and Naaraz-Taaraz tell them the way to kill Bhayankar. In the same manner, the fairies and Baalveer manage to kill Bhayankar pari.

Soon, the natural resources of Pari Lok through their extraordinary signs convey to the fairies that a new Rani Pari will be entering Pari Lok through a special seashell of Pavan Nadi (Holy river). A  new Rani Pari originates from the Pavan Nadi and is welcomed with great pomp and show. She raises a necessity of another hero who could help Baalveer. The fairies finally find another hero and name him Jaiveer. The new Rani Pari asks Baalveer and Jaiveer, as a mode of training, to reach a special palace by crossing the Sandhi Nadi (Connecting River). While doing so, Jaiveer secretly makes Baalveer slip into the river and Baalveer is declared to be dead. Pari Lok mourns the loss of Baalveer. The fairies as per the order of new Rani Pari, donate their powers to Jaiveer and immediately, the environment of Pari Lok turns strange. The wands of fairies and their powers are absorbed by Rani Pari and she is revealed to be none other than Bhayankar Pari herself. Jaiveer was also formed by her. The fairies get shocked on seeing her alive. She reveals that as she sensed that the fairies were planning to kill her, she had already arranged for a new body, that her spirit entered after her death. Then she sealed the shell from which Rani Pari was going to originate and herself, disguised as Rani Pari.

She then captivates the fairies as her maids  and Jaiveer starts spreading evil on Earth. The shining Royal blue shades of Pari Lok blacken out and black fumes get all over. By tricking Bhayankar, Natkhat Pari and Naaraz Pari obtain their and other fairies' magical wands and powers. As they go to open the magical shell, Bhayankar again manages to capture them, but Natkhat Pari accidentally slips into Sandhi Nadi, the same river in which Baalveer had fallen. Ironically, Natkhat finds herself on a seashore of Mumbai. She realises that the river in which she had slipped into, was Sandhi Nadi and magically connects Pari Lok to another planets. Thus, she infers that in this way, Baalveer would also be alive. She manages to find Baalveer and makes him remember his memories. Both of them unlock the real new Rani Pari, she regains the powers of Pari Lok from Bhayankar Pari. Bhayankar Pari escapes from there. Then, the new Rani Pari and Baalveer kill Jaiveer and she is welcomed in Pari Lok with great pomp and show. Pari Lok is cured from the effect of Bhayankar Pari and it again starts shinning in its shades. New Rani Pari fortakes the throne of Pari Lok and guides and helps Baalveer in his mission.

New Ranipari also take care of Baalveer and fairies similar to previous Ranipari whose love is eternal. Whenever Baalveer had a confusion he first discusses it with Ranipari like previous Ranipari whom he loves very much.Bhayankar Pari again uses various methods to destroy Pari Lok and even resurrects Mahabhasma Pari but failed. Bhayankar kills Natkhat Pari, when the later was in the disguise of Baalveer. Bhayankar Pari again summons Nukeeli-Kateeli Pari, Chakravyuh Pari, Saarangi, Bhraman Pari and Patanga Pari, but to her disappointment all failed to defeat Baalveer. Many other villains get resurrected, like Kaakli Dayan, Hubahu, Exam Ghost etc. time to time, but Baalveer manages to defeat them as well. Then Bhayankar Pari resurrects Daityaani Pari, but in her ego, Daityaani tricks Bhayankar into prison. Bhayankar Pari escapes from the prison. Rani Pari gives Baalveer an extraordinary weapon and he kills Bhayankar Pari using the same.

Soon, the spirits of five evil powers - Bhayankar Pari, Bhawandar Pari, Kateeli Pari, Chakravyuh Pari and Mahabhasma Pari get resurrected by Daityaani. All of them sacrifice their spirit to form Mahavinashini Pari, the fairy with the power of five elements. Daityaani refers to Mahavinashini as her slave, which hurts the ego of the latter.

Mahavinashini, feeling insulted, then overpowers and kills Daityaani and herself plots again the fairies. Mahavinashini is killed soon by Baalveer.

Even after 1st Ranipari's death, she helped Baalveer many times. On Earth, Manav and Meher excel in all their tasks and prove to be rising stars in academics. Observing their excellence, Rani Pari blesses them with powers and names them as Baalmitra and Baalsakhi respectively, to help Baalveer in his mission and adventures.

A new evil power- Prachandika gets released from prison, when her sister Virus destroys Pari Lok. Virus is killed and Prachandika tries to avenge Rani Pari for the same. The fairies and Baalveer reconstruct Pari Lok. Prachandika fails in all of her attempts and finally manages to gain Kanishka Tara, which blesses her with the boon of desired death (Iccha Mrityu). Baalveer, along with Baalmitra and Baalsakhi, manages to kill Prachandika. The evil on Earth is finally destroyed. There is peace and righteousness everywhere. Rani Pari sends Baalveer to Gol-Gol Graha to restore peace there as well. The series ends at the note of 'The triumph of Good over Evil'.

Cast

Main
 Dev Joshi as Baal Veer: 1st Ranipari's son, Baalpari's adopted  son, He was born in 2000 A.D. with the blessings of Pari-Tara.                                                He takes up the name Ballu Dagli while living on the Earth at Manav and Meher's house. (2012–2016)
 Karishma Tanna / Shruti Seth as Rani Pari. She is the mother of Baalveer and fairies. She was Bahuroopi Pari and chosen as the Rani Pari by "Pari Maa" to rule over Pari Lok. She is the supreme controller of Parilok. She only gives powers to other fairies. She defeated many evil powers later killed by Chhal Pari. (2012–2013) / (2013)
 Sudeepa Singh as Rani pari. She becomes the new queen of Pari Lok after the previous Rani Pari gets killed by Bhayankar Pari. She also defeated many evil powers. (2014–2016)
 Shama Sikander / Shweta Kawatra as Bhayankar Pari. She was Bhali Pari but due to vengeance towards the fairies and Maa Pari after she wasn't given the throne, she went away and created Bhayanak Lok. She wanted to avenge Rani Pari and Baal Veer for her defeat but gets killed by Baal Veer. (2012–2014, 2014–2015)
 Aditi Sajwan / Neeti Singh as Natkhat Pari, one of the Saptapari; a unique fairy with the power to make anything and change her size. She is very close to Rani pari. She guided Baal Veer throughout his journey to fight evil. She was killed by Bhayankar Pari in 2014 by Zahreela Baan but was resurrected by Rani Pari. (2012–2014, 2016)
 Anushka Sen as Meher Dagli. She becomes Baal Sakhi after she receives powers from all the good fairies of the Pari Lok and helps Baal Veer. (2012–2016)
 Rudra Soni as Manav Dagli. He becomes Baal Mitra after he receives powers from all the good fairies of the Pari Lok and helps Baal Veer. (2012–2016)

Recurring
Rukhsar Rehman as Maa Pari; the creator and former ruler of Pari Lok. She gave her throne to Bahuroopi Pari. (2012)
 Shridhar Watsar as: 
Dooba Dooba 1; the General of all the other dwarfs recruited for the security of the fairies in Pari Lok and the best friend of Baal Veer. (2012–2016) 
Tauba Tauba; a sidekick of all the evil fairies. (2012–2016)
Chocolate Uncle/Monday/Tuesday/Wednesday/Thursday/Friday/Saturday/Sunday. (2013-2014)
Bagi Chacha (Uncle of Gardens). (2012–2016)
Dant Gupt; Tooth Fairy's assistant. (2014)
Ding-dong; assistant of Santa Claus. (2014)
Taalveer.
 Purvesh Pimple as Montu Lakhani; a naughty boy who always troubled Manav, Meher, and other children in the school. (2012–2016)
 Shweta Tiwari  as Mahabhasm Pari; an evil fairy who possessed the power of converting anything into ashes. She was earlier Manbadal Pari who had the power to change anybody's mindset. Later her spirit came to end herself and invite Mahavinasni (Mega Destroyer). (2014-2015)
 Aashka Goradia as Mahavinashini. She was an evil fairy who was created by the 5 elements of nature - Air, Water, Earth, Fire, and Sky. And 5 evil fairies who killed themselves to invite her. They are Mahabhasm Pari, Bhayankar Pari, Bhawandar Pari, Chakravyuh Pari, and Nukeeli Pari. She was also defeated and killed by Baal Veer. (2015–2016)
 Nigaar Khan as Prachandika. She is an evil fairy who comes to avenge Baal Veer for her sister Virus' death, but eventually gets defeated and killed. (2016)
 Gazala Selmin as Shaatir Pari. She was an accomplice fairy of Mahavinashini and Prachandika who advised both of them on the strategies to defeat Baal Veer and the fairies. (2015–2016)
 Reshmi Ghosh as Daityani, an evil fairy who was sleeping for ages due to the magic of the fairies but eventually rose up to avenge them. She was killed by Mahavinashini. (2015)
 Arishfa Khan as: 
Minty; Montu's Cousin (2013)
Dant Pari (2014)
Monica Gehi; a student at Manav and Meher's school. She was considered the most beautiful girl in the school and all the boys loved her. She had a crush on Baalveer after he saved her from drowning. (2016)
 Amita Choksi as Smita Dagli, Manav-Meher's mother. (2012–2016)
 Abhay Harpade as Mahesh Dagli, Manav-Meher's father. (2012–2016)
 Kanha Shashikant Sharma as Rohit; a friend and sidekick of Montu who helped him in troubling children. (2012–2016)
 Keval Vora as Keval; a friend and sidekick of Montu who helped him in troubling children. (2012–2015)
 Raashul Tandon as Rocky Dagli, Manav, Meher, and Ballu's uncle who loved playing like a child. (2012–2016)
 Shruti Bisht as Saloni, Manav-Meher's friend. (2014–2016)
 Viren Vazirani as Pukky, Manav-Meher's friend.
Sharmilee Raj as Baal Pari, one of the Saptapari; a fairy in Pari Lok who had the power of tresses and curls. She is the  adoptive mother of Baal Veer. (2012-2016)
 Lavina Tandon / Neha Narang / Suman Gupta as Gaal Pari, one of the Saptapari; a fairy in Pari Lok who had the power of blowing huge balloons, each of them having unique qualities. (2012–14) / (2014) / (2015–2016)
 Samikssha Batnagar / Minal Mogam as Vijdhar Pari; a fairy in Pari Lok who had the power of electricity. (2012–2013) / (2013–2016)
 Manisha Thakkar as Bhatkati Pari, one of the Saptapari; a fairy in Pari Lok who had the power of diverting things and making illusions to confuse anyone. (2012–2016)
 Sangeeta Khanayat / Dimple Kava as Aarpaar Pari, one of the Saptapari; a fairy in Pari Lok who had the power of going through anything. (2012) / (2013–16)
 Charu Asopa as Atkaati Pari, one of the Saptapari; a fairy in Pari Lok who had the power of creating obstacles in the way of doing anything. (2012–2015)
 Roop Durgapal / Sameeksha Sud as Dari Pari; a fairy in Pari Lok who was always scared but also had the power to frighten others. (2012) / (2013–16)
 Pallavi Dutt as Naraz Pari; a fairy in Pari Lok who initially was jealous of the other fairies and helped Bhayankar Pari but later regretted her mistake took the path of righteousness and helped the other fairies defeat evil. She possessed the power to make someone angry. (2012–2015)
 Meghna Nikade as Chakravyuh Pari; a fairy who had the power of creating mazes and labyrinths and helped Bhayankar Pari in her attempts to defeat Baal Veer. Later her spirit came to end herself and invite Mahavinasni. (2015)
 Navina Bole as Nukeeli/Kateeli Pari; the fairy twins who had the powers of pricking like a needle and cutting like a scissor respectively. They helped Bhayankar Pari in her efforts to defeat Baal Veer. Later her spirit came to end herself and invite Mahavinasni. (2015)
 Tiya Gandwani as Patanga Pari; an evil fairy who possessed the power of flying like a kite. (2015)
 Swati Verma as Kakli Daayan; a witch who wanted to become young by killing children. (2015)
 Priyanka Sharma as Sarangi Pari; an evil fairy who possessed the power of making colors that had different kinds of qualities. (2015)
 Namit Shah as Jaiveer. (2014)
 Sugandha Mishra as Chhal Pari; an evil fairy who had the power to trick anyone and sing beautifully. She helped Bhayankar Pari to defeat Baal Veer. (2013–2014)
 Deepshikha Nagpal as Bawandar Pari; an evil fairy who had the power to create typhoons and whirlwinds. She also helped Bhayankar Pari to defeat Baal Veer. Later her spirit came to end herself and invite Mahavinasni (Mega Destroyer). (2013–2015)
 Akshay Sethi as Mogambo Gomango. (2014)
 Kunal Bakshi as Hubahu. (2015)
 Rajesh Khera as Gurudev. (2016)
 Vaishali Thakkar as Honey Bua. (2015)
 Monaz Mevawala as Bhraman Pari; an evil fairy who returned to avenge Baal Pari for defeating her. Later, she got killed by the fairies. (2014)
 Arsheen Namdar as Chahya Pari; an evil fairy who possessed the qualities of a shadow. She helped Mahabhasm Pari to defeat Baal Veer. (2014)
 Rashmi Singh as Taraz Pari; a fairy in Pari Lok who possessed the quality of breaking things. She was earlier the friend of Naraz Pari and helped Bhayankar Pari but later reconciled. (2012–2013)
 Dilip Shah as Goba-Goba. (2013–2014)
 Geetanjali as Jwala. (2014)
 Nilu Roy as Navrang Pari; a fairy in Pari Lok who possessed the power to change the color of an object into nine different colors.
 Kamya Pandey as Sapna Pari; a fairy in Pari Lok who is in charge of protecting one's dream. (2015)
 Ekroop Bedi as Vigyan Pari (Science Fairy); a fairy who acts as a scientist and inventor of Pari Lok. She possessed the power of science. (2015)
 Piya Valecha as Suraksha Pari (Protection Fairy); a fairy who is in charge of Prison's protection.
 Rashami Patil as Rakshak Pari; a fairy who knows about the secret of Baal Veer's past life other than Rani pari. She was the secret messenger of Rani pari.(2015)
 Danica Moadi as Bhari Pari; a fairy who possessed the power to make someone cry. (2012)
 Shahina Surve as Firang Pari; a fairy who appears like a foreigner. (2012–13)
 Kavalya Chheda as Ronnie, a bully who always troubled Manav, Meher and other children in the school like Montu. (2014)
Javed Pathan as Egyptian king(Pherro yoddha) Mummy

Guest appearances
Bharti Singh as Bharti Mausi (2014)
Kurt Angle as Kurt Angle (2014)

References

External links

Sony SAB original programming
Indian children's television series
Indian action television series
Indian superhero television shows
Television about fairies and sprites
2012 Indian television series debuts
2016 Indian television series endings
Television series by Optimystix Entertainment
Indian fantasy television series